Olympique Lyonnais are a French professional football club based in Lyon, Rhône-Alpes, who currently play in Ligue 1, France's highest football division.  This chronological list comprises all those who have held the position of manager of the first team of Lyon since their foundation in 1950.

Managers

References

Managers
Olympique Lyonnais